Standish Backus, Jr. (1910–1989) was a United States military artist. Born in Detroit, he attended Princeton University, where he obtained a degree in architecture. He then spent a year at the University of Munich studying painting. After a brief period in Maine studying watercolor under Eliot O'Hara, he relocated to Santa Barbara, in 1935 and began working full-time as an artist. At the start of the Second World War he commissioned as an ensign in the Naval Reserve in 1940, and became an active-duty officer in 1941. He spent most of the war assigned to Net and Boom Defenses in the South Pacific.

He transferred to a special graphic presentation unit in 1945 and spent the last year of the Pacific theater as a combat artist. By the end of the war he had obtained the rank of commander. He left active service in May 1946 and taught at the University of California, Santa Barbara from 1947 to 1948.

He returned to active duty in 1955 to 1956 to travel with Admiral Richard Evelyn Byrd to Antarctica as part of "Operation Deepfreeze" to record images of the exploration.

Backus returned to California and continued to paint. He died in Santa Barbara in 1989. His work is in the collections of the Santa Barbara Museum of Art, the Los Angeles County Museum of Art, and the Naval Historical Center.

References
 
 on the Los Angeles County Museum of Art website
on the Sullivan Goss Gallery website

1910 births
1989 deaths
20th-century American painters
American male painters
Painters from California
Princeton University School of Architecture alumni
Artists from Detroit
American expatriates in Germany
20th-century American male artists